"Slow Hand" is a song recorded by American vocal group The Pointer Sisters for their eighth studio album Black & White (1981). The song, written by Michael Clark and John Bettis, was released by the Planet label in May 1981 as the lead single from Black & White.

Background and impact
Although its sultry style recalls the Pointer Sisters' first American top-ten hit, the 1978 number two hit "Fire", "Slow Hand" was not written for the group; in fact John Bettis stated that "the Pointer Sisters were the furthest [act] from [the composers'] minds." However producer Richard Perry said he "knew 'Slow Hand' [would be] an instant smash [hit]...that...would recapitulate and expand on the intimacy [of] 'Fire'." Like "Fire"—which also featured Anita Pointer on lead—"Slow Hand" peaked at number two on the Billboard Hot 100, for 3 weeks, behind "Endless Love" by Diana Ross and Lionel Richie. "Slow Hand" reached that position in August 1981 when it also reached number seven on the Hot R&B/Hip-Hop Songs chart. In September 1981, the single was certified Gold by the RIAA. "Slow Hand" also afforded the Pointer Sisters international success, including the first appearance by the group in the top-ten on the UK Singles Chart. "Slow Hand" was ranked in the top 25 best singles of the year by The Village Voice Pazz & Jop poll.

Personnel 
The Pointer Sisters
 Anita Pointer – lead vocals
 June Pointer – backing vocals
 Ruth Pointer – backing vocals

Musicians
 John Barnes – electric piano 
 William "Smitty" Smith – organ
 Paul Jackson Jr. – guitar
 Tim May – guitar
 Nathan Watts – bass
 John Robinson – drums 
 Paulinho da Costa – percussion

Charts

Weekly charts

Year-end charts

Del Reeves version
The song was covered in 1981 by country singer Del Reeves, whose version peaked at #53 on the Hot Country Singles chart.

Conway Twitty version

The song was covered in April 1982 by country singer Conway Twitty with minor lyric changes to accommodate a heterosexual male singer. His version, on Elektra Records, topped the Billboard Hot Country Singles chart for two weeks that June, and was his last multi-week number-one song.

Weekly charts

Year-end charts

References

1981 singles
1982 singles
The Pointer Sisters songs
Conway Twitty songs
Del Reeves songs
Songs with lyrics by John Bettis
Songs written by Michael Clark (songwriter)
Song recordings produced by Jimmy Bowen
Song recordings produced by Richard Perry
Elektra Records singles
1981 songs
Planet Records singles